The  New York Giants season was the franchise's 54th season in the National Football League. In their first ever season that had a sixteen-game schedule, the Giants looked to improve on their 5–9 record from 1977. The season saw the Giants get off to a hot start. They beat newcomer Tampa Bay in Tampa 19–13, despite being a 1 point underdog. After a close loss to the rival Cowboys 34–24 the next week, the Giants beat the Kansas City Chiefs 26–10 and the San Francisco 49ers 27–10 to start the season 3–1, their first 3–1 start since 1969. However, the Giants then started to struggle, losing to the Atlanta Falcons 23–20 and the Cowboys again 24–3. Following wins at home against the Buccaneers and Redskins, the Giants went on a downfall, which saw them lose their next 6 games and 7 of their last 8. In week 12, the Giants played their arch-rivals, the Philadelphia Eagles, in a crucial game that saw the Giants fumble away the game on Joe Pisarcik’s fumble and Herm Edwards fumble recovery for a touchdown that won the game for Philadelphia, 19-17. The play was dubbed the “Miracle at the Meadowlands”. The Giants never recovered from this game, getting pummeled on the road to the 3–9 Bills, 41–17, despite having a 10 point lead in the 4th quarter. In their final game, a rematch with Philadelphia, the Giants lost 20–3 to end the season 6–10.

Offseason

Draft

Roster

Regular season 

The Miracle at the Meadowlands is the term used by sportscasters and Philadelphia Eagles fans for a fumble recovery by cornerback Herman Edwards that he returned for a touchdown at the end of a November 19, 1978 NFL game against the New York Giants in Giants Stadium. It was seen as miraculous because it occurred at a point in the game when the Giants were easily capable of running out the game's final seconds. The Giants had the ball, and the Eagles had no timeouts left. Everyone watching expected quarterback Joe Pisarcik to take one more snap and kneel with the ball, thus running out the clock and preserving a 17–12 Giant upset. Instead, he attempted to hand it off to fullback Larry Csonka and botched it, allowing Edwards to pick up the ball and run 26 yards for the winning score.

Schedule 

Note: Intra-division opponents are in bold text.

Game summaries

Week 4 
Television Network: CBS
Announcers: Don Criqui and Tom Matte
Joe Pisarcik threw a 29-yard touchdown pass to Al Dixon early in the game and Bobby Hammond set up two other touchdowns with long runs as the Giants are so far surprising the football world with a 3-1 record with a win over winless San Francsico. New York's Larry Csonka became the sixth player in NFL history to rush for 7,000 yards and he himself scored a 1-yard touchdown run in period 1 while Willie Spencer of the Giants scored a 1-yard touchdown run in period 3 while Joe Danelo kicked two field goals of 28 and 52 yards to provide the Giants scoring that day.

Week 12

Week 14 at Bills

Standings

See also 
 List of New York Giants seasons

References 

 New York Giants on Pro Football Reference
 Giants on jt-sw.com

New York Giants seasons
New York Giants
New York Giants
20th century in East Rutherford, New Jersey
Meadowlands Sports Complex